Niha is a Syrian village in the al-Shaykh Badr District in Tartous Governorate. It is situated between Wadi al-Uyun to the east, al-Shaykh Badr to the west. According to the Syria Central Bureau of Statistics (CBS), Niha had a population of 1,182 in the 2004 census.

References

Alawite communities in Syria
Populated places in Al-Shaykh Badr District